Malayalam is a Unicode block containing characters of the Malayalam script. In its original incarnation, the code points U+0D02..U+0D4D were a direct copy of the Malayalam characters A2-ED from the 1988 ISCII standard. The Devanagari, Bengali, Gurmukhi, Gujarati, Oriya, Tamil, Telugu, and Kannada blocks were similarly all based on their ISCII encodings.

Block

History
The following Unicode-related documents record the purpose and process of defining specific characters in the Malayalam block:

References 

Unicode blocks